The Argus Fernfeuer (Long-Range Fire) concept was proposed in 1939 as an unmanned aerial vehicle (UAV) for mine-laying. Later roles were planned for bombing, the dropping of torpedoes and long-range reconnaissance. Development was halted in 1941 but the project, also known as Erfurt, evolved into the V1.

Development
Arising from the Argus As 292 project, the Argus Fernfeuer was also designed by Fritz Gosslau. During the testing of the small As 292 drone, Gosslau proposed an aircraft-sized UAV capable of delivering a one tonne drop charge over long distances. Control was either by line-of-sight radio control or by radio beam direction. A crewed aircraft, flying clear of local defenses, would signal the UAV to release the drop-load. The Fernfeuer aircraft would then return to base.

Guidance expertise would have been from C. Lorenz; airframe advice and construction by Arado. A crewed variant, intended as a command aircraft, was also included in the proposal.

Presented to Reichsluftfahrtministerium (RLM) on November 9, 1939. Despite initial interest in the Fernfeuer concept, the RLM informed Gosslau and the Argus company that the project was to be shelved. Development abandoned by January 1941 in favor of the V-1 flying bomb.

References
 Holsken, Dieter, V-missiles of the Third Reich the V-1 and V-2 (1994), pp. 46–49, 343. Primary source for much of the information are the personal documents of Fritz Gosslau.

Fernfeuer
Abandoned military aircraft projects of Germany
1940s German bomber aircraft
Unmanned military aircraft of Germany